OJN is an abbreviation for Order of Julian of Norwich, a contemplative community of monks and nuns in the Episcopal Church.

OJN may also refer to:

 OJN (musician), a musician signed on to Loca Records
 OJN (song), a 1984 song by Hal Russell off the album Conserving NRG
 Orkhon Jims Nogoo (stock ticker: OJN), a foodstuffs company listed on the Mongolian Stock Exchange, see List of companies listed on the Mongolian Stock Exchange

See also

 ONJ (disambiguation)
 JNO (disambiguation)
 Jon (disambiguation)
 NJO (disambiguation)
 NOJ (disambiguation)